John Wilford was a bookseller.

John Wilford may also refer to:

John Wilford (MP)
John Noble Wilford
John Wilford, the secretary of the Libertarian National Committee since 2021

See also